Jeff Attinella (born September 29, 1988) is an American former professional soccer player who previously played as a goalkeeper for Major League Soccer club Portland Timbers.

Career

College and amateur
Attinella is a product of the University of South Florida where he played between 2007 and 2010. He was awarded NSCAA Third Team All-Region, Hermann Trophy Watch List and Soccer America Preseason All American in 2010, NSCAA First Team All-American, Big East Goalkeeper of the Year and NSCAA All-Region First Team in 2009 and NSCAA All-Region Second Team in 2008.

During his college years, Attinella also played with the Bradenton Academics of the USL Premier Development League.

Professional
On January 18, 2011, Attinella was drafted in the first round (14th overall) in the 2011 MLS Supplemental Draft by Real Salt Lake, but was released by the club without signing. Attinella signed his first professional contract with FC Tampa Bay on February 22, 2011, and made his professional debut on April 30 against the Atlanta Silverbacks, coming on as a substitute when Tampa's first choice goalkeeper Daryl Sattler suffered an injury.

Tampa Bay picked up the 2012 season option on Attinella's contract on October 4, 2011. The 2012 NASL season proved to be a breakthrough year for Attinella, who played every minute of every match for the Rowdies, won five NASL Defensive Player of the Week awards, one NASL Player of the Month Award, and was named to the 2012 NASL Best XI. Attinella saved three penalties in the Rowdies' NASL Championship victory against Minnesota Stars FC to capture the Soccer Bowl trophy.

Following a successful second season with the Rowdies, Real Salt Lake of MLS announced that they had signed Attinella on December 3, 2012. He made his RSL debut as a second-half sub for an injured Josh Saunders in a 3–0 win against FC Dallas on July 13.

Attinella was selected by Minnesota United FC in the 2016 MLS Expansion Draft and quickly traded to Portland Timbers in exchange for a second-round pick in the 2018 MLS SuperDraft. In mid-2019, Attinella underwent surgery to repair an anterior labrum tear in his right shoulder, which caused him to miss the second half of the 2019 MLS season.

Personal life

Attinella has one daughter and one son with his wife Kendall. Together with his wife and father-in-law, he founded a publishing company called "It Had to Be Told" to publish Attinella's children books that he describes as "nursery rhymes with a sports emphasis". In May 2020, Attinella and his publishing company donated 1,000 copies of his book "The Curse Ends: The Story of the 2016 Chicago Cubs" to a Chicago non-profit that provides low-income and homeless families with essential educational items.

Honors
Tampa Bay Rowdies
North American Soccer League (1): 2012

Real Salt Lake
Major League Soccer Western Conference Championship (1): 2013

Portland Timbers
Major League Soccer Western Conference Championship (1): 2018
MLS is Back Tournament: 2020

References

External links
 
 USF Profile

1988 births
Living people
American soccer players
South Florida Bulls men's soccer players
IMG Academy Bradenton players
Tampa Bay Rowdies players
Real Salt Lake players
Fort Lauderdale Strikers players
Real Monarchs players
Portland Timbers players
Portland Timbers 2 players
Soccer players from Florida
Real Salt Lake draft picks
USL League Two players
North American Soccer League players
Major League Soccer players
USL Championship players
Sportspeople from Clearwater, Florida
All-American men's college soccer players
Association football goalkeepers